Apodemia virgulti, or Behr's metalmark, is a species of metalmark in the butterfly family Riodinidae.

Subspecies
These eight subspecies belong to the species Apodemia virgulti:
 Apodemia virgulti arenaria J. Emmel & T. Emmel in T. Emmel, 1998
 Apodemia virgulti davenporti J. Emmel, T. Emmel & Pratt in T. Emmel, 1998
 Apodemia virgulti dialeucoides J. Emmel, T. Emmel & Pratt in T. Emmel, 1998
 Apodemia virgulti mojavelimbus J. Emmel, T. Emmel & Pratt in T. Emmel, 1998
 Apodemia virgulti nigrescens J. Emmel & T. Emmel in T. Emmel, 1998
 Apodemia virgulti peninsularis J. Emmel, T. Emmel & Pratt in T. Emmel, 1998
 Apodemia virgulti pratti J. Emmel & T. Emmel in T. Emmel, 1998
 Apodemia virgulti virgulti (Behr, 1865)

References

Further reading

 

Apodemia
Articles created by Qbugbot
Butterflies described in 1865